Janet Eissenstat is the former Director of the President’s Commission on White House Fellowships for the George W. Bush Administration. She continued to serve in that position in the Administration of President Barack Obama until Mr. Obama named Cindy S. Moelis as her successor in April 2009.

References

Living people
Year of birth missing (living people)